Laçin is a town in Çorum Province in the Black Sea region of Turkey. It is located at 29 km from the city of Çorum. It is the seat of Laçin District. Its population is 1,291 (2022). The mayor is İdris Görükmez (AKP).

Geography
The climate has features of both the dry Central Anatolian plain and the Black Sea coast; winters are cold, summers are hot and dry, with most rainfall in spring. The district is partially mountainous and wooded. Being so close to the city of Çorum the district has little economic strength of its own; people live on growing grains, chickpeas and other crops. 

The town of Laçin provides the district with high schools, a hospital and other basic amenities.

References

Populated places in Çorum Province
Laçin District
Towns in Turkey